Watermelon Man is a 1970 American comedy film directed by Melvin Van Peebles and starring Godfrey Cambridge, Estelle Parsons, Howard Caine, D'Urville Martin, Kay Kimberley, Mantan Moreland, and Erin Moran. Written by Herman Raucher, it tells the story of an extremely bigoted 1960s-era white insurance salesman named Jeff Gerber, who wakes up one morning to find that he has become black. The premise for the film was inspired by Franz Kafka's Metamorphosis, and by John Howard Griffin's autobiographical Black Like Me.

Van Peebles' only studio film, Watermelon Man was a financial success, but Van Peebles did not accept Columbia Pictures' three-picture contract, instead developing the independent film Sweet Sweetback's Baadasssss Song. The music for Watermelon Man, written and performed by Van Peebles, was released on a soundtrack album, which spawned the single "Love, That's America".

Plot
Jeff Gerber lives in an average suburban neighborhood with his seemingly liberal housewife Althea, who tolerates her husband's character flaws out of love. Every morning when Jeff wakes up, he spends some time under a tanning machine, hits the speedbag, drinks a health drink, and races the bus to work on foot.

Jeff presents himself as happy-go-lucky and quite a joker, but others tend to see him as obnoxious and boorish. Althea, who watches the race riots every night on TV with great interest, chastises Jeff for not having sympathy for the problems of black Americans.

One morning, Jeff wakes up to find that his pigment has changed. He tries to fall back asleep, thinking that it is a dream, but to no avail. He tries taking a shower to wash the "black" off him, but finds it does not work, when Althea walks into the bathroom, and screams. He explains to her that the "Negro in the bathroom" is him.

At first, Jeff believes this to be the result of spending too much time under the tanning machine. He spends almost the entire day at home, afraid to go out of the house, only going out once to venture into the "colored part of town" in order to find a pharmacy to buy "the stuff they use in order to make themselves look white." His attempts to change his skin color fail.

The next day, he is persuaded to get up and go to work. Things start out well at first, until Jeff is accused of robbery while running alongside the bus to work. The policeman assumes that, since he is a black man, he must have stolen something. During his lunch break, he makes an appointment with his doctor who cannot explain Jeff's condition either. After several calls, the doctor suggests that Jeff might be more comfortable with a black doctor.

Returning home, he finds Althea afraid to answer the phone. He does not understand why until he receives a call from a man who uses racial slurs. At work the next day, a secretary who had previously ignored him makes several advances toward him, finding him more attractive as a black man. Jeff's boss suggests that they could drum up extra business with a "Negro" salesman and reassigns him to deal only with black customers.

At home one evening, he finds the people who had made the threatening phone calls are neighbors who offer him $50,000 for his home due to fear of property depreciation. Jeff manages to raise the price to $100,000. Althea sends the children to live with her sister and later leaves her husband. Jeff sleeps with the secretary but is repulsed by her objectification of him afterwards. Finally accepting that he is black, Jeff resigns his regular job, buys an apartment building, and starts his own insurance company. The last scene shows him practicing martial arts with a group of black menial workers.

Cast

In addition, songwriter and then-burgeoning actor Paul Williams (credited as Paul H. Williams), makes a brief appearance as an employment office clerk. Van Peebles also has a short cameo at the end of the film as a sign painter putting Jeff's name on his new office door.

Production
Herman Raucher wrote the script on spec in 1969, after realizing that several of his friends who espoused liberal sympathies still admitted to holding on to racist ideologies. Columbia Pictures liked the idea but were afraid to make the film without a black director; they hired Van Peebles based on his film Story of a Three Day Pass.

Godfrey Cambridge plays the role of Jeff Gerber in whiteface for the first few minutes of the film, and then goes without the makeup when his character changes into a black man. Before Van Peebles had come into the project, the studio had told him that they were planning to cast a white actor like Alan Arkin or Jack Lemmon to play the part. Van Peebles suggested that they cast a black actor instead.

Raucher and Van Peebles frequently clashed on set, as Raucher intended the movie to be a satire of white, liberal America, whereas Van Peebles wanted to change Raucher's script to make it a black power movie. Raucher ended up novelizing his own screenplay to ensure that his original vision for the story survived in some form. Writing the book himself also ensured that Van Peebles could not enact a clause in his contract that would have allowed him to write it.

On the film's DVD release, Van Peebles says that Raucher wanted the film to end with Gerber waking up to discover that the events of the movie had only been a nightmare, and convinced studio executives to allow him to film two alternate endings. Per Van Peebles he only filmed the current ending of the movie, forgetting to shoot the "it was all a dream" ending "by accident." Raucher's novelization of his own script, however, includes the "workout" ending.

Release
The film opened at the Murray Hill and New Penthouse Theatres in New York on May 27, 1970.

Reception
Columbia was happy with the finished product, and the film was a financial success, leading the studio to offer Van Peebles a three-picture contract. Instead of taking their offer, Van Peebles made the independent film Sweet Sweetback's Baadasssss Song, which later turned out to not only be the highest-grossing independent film of 1971, but also the highest-grossing independent film up to that point. Following that film's success, Columbia rescinded Van Peebles' contract offer.

In an analysis of Watermelon Man in Film Quarterly, scholar Raquel Gates describes it as a "cunning subversion of Hollywood and television conventions."

The film grossed $61,000 in its opening week. It earned theatrical rentals of $1.1 million in the United States and Canada.

Soundtrack

Van Peebles wrote the music to Watermelon Man himself, in order to have creative control. A soundtrack album was released in 1970, and "Love, That's America", a song from the film and soundtrack, was released as a single in the same year. The single was mentioned as a top pick in Billboard Magazine's Oct 31, 1970 issue.

The song is narrated from the point of view of someone walking around America, and seeing "people run through the streets, blood streaming from where they been beat", and declaring "naw, this ain't America, you can't fool me".

The soundtrack album was never released on compact disc, although it was released as a digital download through Amazon MP3 and iTunes.

Track listing

See also
 List of American films of 1970

References

External links
 
 
 
 
 
 Watermelon Man: Melvin in Hollywoodland an essay by Racquel J. Gates at the Criterion Collection

1970 comedy films
1970 films
American comedy films
American satirical films
Columbia Pictures films
1970s English-language films
Films about race and ethnicity
Films about racism
Ethnic humour
Stereotypes of African Americans
Films directed by Melvin Van Peebles
Films with screenplays by Herman Raucher
1970s American films
Films about salespeople